Hemicephalis is a genus of moths of the family Erebidae. The genus was erected by Heinrich Benno Möschler in 1890.

Species
 Hemicephalis agenoria H. Druce, 1890
 Hemicephalis alesa H. Druce, 1890
 Hemicephalis characteria Stoll, [1790]
 Hemicephalis grandirena Schaus, 1915
 Hemicephalis krugii Möschler, 1890
 Hemicephalis laronia H. Druce, 1890
 Hemicephalis paulina H. Druce, 1889
 Hemicephalis phoenicias Hampson, 1926
 Hemicephalis proserpina H. Druce, 1906
 Hemicephalis rufipes Felder & Rogenhofer, 1874

References

Calpinae